The Palazzo Hercolani or Ercolani is a large Rococo or Neoclassic-style palace in Strada Maggiore in central Bologna, which now serves as the offices for the Political Science Department (Facoltà di Scienze Politiche) of the University of Bologna.

History

The palace we see today was commissioned in 1785 by aristocrat Filippo Hercolani; the architect was Angelo Venturoli. While the facade has classic restraint, the internal grand staircase and internal decorations are evidence of the late-Baroque or Rococo ornateness. On the first floor is a room frescoed likely by Pedrini with scenes dedicated to Fame and the Human Genius depicting Homer, Pindar, Hesiod, and Democritus. Two rooms were decorated in chinoiserie style by Davide Zanotti. Other rooms bear decorations and paintings by Giovanni Battista Frulli, Luigi Busatti, Antonio Basoli, Gaetano Caponeri, Flaminio Minozzi, Vincenzo Martinelli, and other artists.

Of particular note two ground floor rooms, the neoclassic Zodiac Room with frescoes probably by Basoli, and the Winter Garden room - the "woodland" painted by Rodolfo Fantuzzi. Both overlook the garden of the Palazzo, which in its heyday, contained a "magnificent large garden, part French and part English, adorned with factories, small mountains".

Sources
 Entry in City Tourism Website

References 

Houses completed in the 18th century
Palaces in Bologna
Neoclassical architecture in Bologna
18th-century architecture in Italy